Georges de La Rochethulon (1868-1941) was a French politician. He served as a member of the Chamber of Deputies for Vendée from 1902 to 1906.

References

1868 births
1941 deaths
People from Versailles
Politicians from Île-de-France
Popular Liberal Action politicians
Members of the 8th Chamber of Deputies of the French Third Republic
Collège Stanislas de Paris alumni
École Spéciale Militaire de Saint-Cyr alumni
19th-century French military personnel